The Marriage of Krechinsky is a 1908 Russian short comedy film directed by Alexander Drankov.

Plot 
The film is a screen version of a series of scenes from the comedy Krechinsky's Wedding by Aleksandr Sukhovo-Kobylin.

Cast 
 Vladimir Davydov as Rasplyuyev
 V. Garlin as Fyodor
 A. Novinsky as Krechinsky

References

External links 
 
 «The Marriage of Krechinsky» on KM.ru

1908 films
1900s Russian-language films
Russian silent short films
Russian black-and-white films
1908 short films
Films of the Russian Empire
Russian comedy films
1908 comedy films
Silent comedy films